Nobressart is a village of Wallonia and a district of the municipality of Attert, located in the province of Luxembourg, Belgium.  

Nearby is the source of the Attert River.

The village is a member of the organisation Les Plus Beaux Villages de Wallonie.

 Nobressart's webpage.

Former municipalities of Luxembourg (Belgium)
Attert